The 2000 Indy Racing Northern Light Series was another season that saw a high level of parity, as only one driver, champion Buddy Lazier, won more than a single race. It also saw the beginning of the jump from CART as Al Unser Jr. moved to the series full-time and Chip Ganassi Racing came over to run the Indy 500, which it won with driver Juan Pablo Montoya. It was also the final season for the Riley & Scott chassis, which also saw its first series win in 2000.

A planned race at Cleveland was cancelled on September 9, 2000, and reverted to a CART event.

Confirmed entries

Season Summary

Schedule

Race results 

Note: All races running on Oval/Speedway.

Race summaries

Delphi Indy 200
This race was held January 29 at Walt Disney World Speedway. Greg Ray won the pole.

Top ten results
24- Robbie Buhl
91- Buddy Lazier
51- Eddie Cheever
4- Scott Goodyear
11- Eliseo Salazar
98- Donnie Beechler
14- Jeff Ward
12- Buzz Calkins
81- Billy Boat
55- Robby McGehee

This was Robbie Buhl's 2nd and final IndyCar victory.
This was the final Indy Racing League event at the track.

MCI WorldCom Indy 200
This race was held March 19 at Phoenix International Raceway. Greg Ray won the pole.

Top ten results
91- Buddy Lazier
4- Scott Goodyear
98- Donnie Beechler
11- Eliseo Salazar
8- Scott Sharp
81- Billy Boat
24- Robbie Buhl
7- Stephan Gregoire
3- Al Unser Jr.
51- Eddie Cheever

This was the first victory for the Riley & Scott chassis

Vegas Indy 300
This race was held April 22 at Las Vegas Motor Speedway. Mark Dismore won the pole.

Top ten results
3- Al Unser Jr.
28- Mark Dismore
18- Sam Hornish Jr. 
6- Jeret Schroeder 
24- Robbie Buhl
5- Robby McGehee
81- Billy Boat
20- Tyce Carlson
1- Greg Ray
33- Jaques Lazier

This was Al Unser Jr.'s 1st victory since the 1995 CART Molson Indy Vancouver and his 1st IRL victory.

84th Indianapolis 500
The Indy 500 was held May 28 at Indianapolis Motor Speedway. Greg Ray sat on pole.

Top ten results
9- Juan Pablo Montoya 
91- Buddy Lazier
11- Eliseo Salazar
14- Jeff Ward
51- Eddie Cheever
32- Robby Gordon
10- Jimmy Vasser
7- Stephan Gregoire
4- Scott Goodyear
8- Scott Sharp

Juan Pablo Montoya was the 1st rookie since Graham Hill (1966) to win the Indianapolis 500 as a rookie.
Buddy Lazier took over the points lead after this race by 26 points over Robbie Buhl.

Casino Magic 500
This race was held June 11 at Texas Motor Speedway. Qualifying was rained out and Buddy Lazier was on the pole based on points standings.

Top ten results
8- Scott Sharp
5- Robby McGehee
3- Al Unser Jr.
12- Buzz Calkins
4- Scott Goodyear
28- Mark Dismore
91- Buddy Lazier
55- Shigeaki Hattori 
51- Eddie Cheever
88- Airton Daré 

This was Robby McGehee's best ever finish.
Shigeaki Hattori debuts after a disappointing 1999 CART season which ended after his CART competition license was revoked at Laguna Seca.

Radisson 200
This race was held June 18 at Pikes Peak International Raceway. Greg Ray won the pole.

Top ten results
51- Eddie Cheever
88- Airton Daré 
8- Scott Sharp
28- Mark Dismore
98- Donnie Beechler
11- Eliseo Salazar
6- Jeret Schroeder 
7- Stephan Gregoire
33- Jaques Lazier
3- Al Unser Jr.

This was the Infiniti engine's 1st victory.

Midas 500 Classic
This race was held July 15 at Atlanta Motor Speedway. Greg Ray won the pole.

Top ten results
1- Greg Ray
91- Buddy Lazier
3- Al Unser Jr.
5- Robby McGehee
98- Donnie Beechler
24- Robbie Buhl
7- Stephan Gregoire
81- Billy Boat
55- Shigeaki Hattori 
11- Eliseo Salazar

Belterra Resort Indy 300
The inaugural Indy Racing League event was held August 27 at Kentucky Speedway. Scott Goodyear won the pole.

Top ten results
91- Buddy Lazier
4- Scott Goodyear
15- Sarah Fisher 
51- Eddie Cheever
7- Stephan Gregoire
14- Jeff Ward
1- Greg Ray
55- Shigeaki Hattori 
18- Sam Hornish Jr. 
98- Donnie Beechler

This was Roberto Guerrero's final IndyCar race he qualified for. He would blow an engine after completing 48 laps and would finish 23rd.
Sarah Fisher becomes the first woman to lead laps and finish on the Podium in an IRL race.

Excite 500
This race was held October 15 at Texas Motor Speedway. Greg Ray won the pole.

Top ten results
4- Scott Goodyear
51- Eddie Cheever
81- Billy Boat
91- Buddy Lazier
11- Eliseo Salazar
98- Donnie Beechler
55- Shigeaki Hattori 
14- Jeff Ward
12- Buzz Calkins
16- Jaques Lazier

 This was the final race victory for Scott Goodyear as he lost his ride to Sam Hornish Jr. in the off-season, then during the 2001 Indianapolis 500 he would suffer career ending injuries after a huge accident during that race.

Final points standings 

 Ties in points broken by number of wins, followed by number of 2nds, 3rds, etc., and then by number of pole positions, followed by number of times qualified 2nd, etc.
Additional points were awarded to the pole winner (3 points), the second best qualifier (2 points), the third best qualifier (1 point) and to the driver leading the most laps (2 point).

See also 
 2000 Indianapolis 500
 2000 Indy Lights season
 2000 CART season
 2000 Toyota Atlantic Championship season
 https://web.archive.org/web/20160304065043/http://www.champcarstats.com/year/2000i.htm
 http://media.indycar.com/pdf/2011/IICS_2011_Historical_Record_Book_INT6.pdf  (p. 130–131)

 
Indy Racing League
IndyCar Series seasons
Indy Racing League